Rapala sphinx, the brilliant flash, is a species of lycaenid or blue butterfly found in Asia.

References 

Rapala (butterfly)
Butterflies of Asia
Butterflies described in 1775
Taxa named by Johan Christian Fabricius